Empoli F.C. is an Italian professional football club based in Empoli, Florence, who play their matches in Stadio Carlo Castellani. The club was formed in 1920, and the club's formal debut in an official league was in 1921. Before that time they played several amateur tournaments.

The club has won the Serie B three times.

Empoli has played the Serie A 11 seasons, Serie B 19 seasons, Serie C (or equivalent) 48 seasons, Serie D (or equivalent) 7 seasons and 8 seasons in lower competitions.

This list details the club's achievements in major competitions, and the top scorers for each season. Top scorers in bold were also the top scorers in the Italian league that season. Records of local or regional competitions are not included due to them being considered of less importance.

Key

 Pld = Games played
 W = Games won
 D = Games drawn
 L = Games lost
 GF = Goals for
 GA = Goals against
 Pts = Points
 Pos = Final position

 Serie A = 1st Tier in Italian League
 Serie B = 2nd Tier in Italian League
 Serie C = 3rd Tier in Italian League
 Prima Categoria = 1st Tier until 1922
 Promozione = 2nd Tier until 1922
 Prima Divisione = 1st Tier until 1926
 Prima Divisione = 2nd Tier (1926–1929)
 Seconda Divisione = 2nd Tier until 1926
 Seconda Divisione = 3rd Tier (1926–1929)
 Divisione Nazionale = 1st Tier (1926–1929)

 F = Final
 SF = Semi-finals
 QF = Quarter-finals
 R16 = Last 16
 R32 = Last 32
 QR1 = First Qualifying Round
 QR2 = Second Qualifying Round
 QR3 = Third Qualifying Round
 PO = Play-Offs
 1R = Round 1
 2R = Round 2
 3R = Round 3
 GS = Group Stage
 2GS = Second Group Stage

 EC = European Cup (1955–1992)
 UCL = UEFA Champions League (1993–present)
 CWC = UEFA Cup Winners' Cup (1960–1999)
 UC = UEFA Cup (1971–2008)
 UEL = UEFA Europa League (2009–present)
 USC = UEFA Super Cup
 INT = Intercontinental Cup (1960–2004)
 WC = FIFA Club World Cup (2005–present)

Seasons

References

Seasons
Empoli